Siranush Gasparyan (Հայերեն: Սիրանուշ Գասպարյան, Русский: Сирануш Гаспарян) (born on August 22, 1978, in Sukhum, Georgia) is an Armenian dramatic soprano.

Biography
Siranush Gasparyan was born in Sukhum in 1977. In 1991 the family moved to Yerevan, Armenia where Siranush graduated from Music High School after Tchaikovsky. In 2002 she got double Master Degree from Fortepiano and Vocal (Opera singing) departments of the Yerevan State Conservatory after Komitas. From 2003 – 2005 she was enrolled in post-graduate vocal course, class of the professor Elena Vardanyan. Since year 2001 Siranush is performing on the stage, participates in singing contents in Armenia and Europe, she is also teaching at the Yerevan State Conservatory.

She won best singer in a national competition and is a highly regarded performer with the Armenian Philharmonic Orchestra where she has been a top billed soloist. She has performed as a soloist at important venues like the Armenian theater and internationally in venues like Days of Armenian Culture 2014 in Stuttgart.

Key performances
October, 2010, Yerevan, Armenia. Concert with National Chamber Orchestra of Armenia, Conductor Ruben Asatryan. In the program: Vivaldi, Andriessen, Aram Satian
February, 2010, Yerevan, Armenia. Recital at House of Chamber Music named after Komitas. In the program: Wagner, Beethoven, Mozart, Barber, Medtner, Rachmaninoff, Tchaikovsky
April, 2009,Yerevan, Armenia. Recital at House of Chamber music named after Komitas (voice and organ). In the program: European and Armenian spiritual music
October, 2009, Yerevan, Armenia. Concert with Veradznund Chamber Orchestra, Conductor Ruben Asatryan. In the program: Handel
December, 2009, Ruben Asatryan. Concert with National Chamber Orchestra of Armenia, Conductor Ruben Asatryan. In the program: Symphony No. 2 (Mahler)

References

External links 
 Concert of Siranush Gasparyan
 News report in Georgian
 Siranush Gasparian - Puccini Tosca, "Vissi d'arte"

Living people
Armenian operatic sopranos
1978 births
People from Sukhumi
Abkhaz Armenians
Georgian people of Armenian descent
21st-century Armenian women opera singers